Robert Conrad may refer to:

People
Robert Conrad (1935–2020), American film and television actor
 Robert Dexter Conrad (1905–1949), U.S. Navy officer
 Robert J. Conrad (born 1958), U.S. federal judge
 Robert T. Conrad (1810–1858), mayor of Philadelphia

See also
Conrad Roberts, American film and television actor
Robert Conrad Hahn (1921–1996), American politician from Massachusetts
 USNS Robert D. Conrad (T-AGOR-3), the lead ship of the Robert D. Conrad-class oceanographic research ships

Conrad, Joseph